Untitled is an outdoor 1975 sculpture by Lee Kelly, installed at Louisa Boren Park in Seattle, Washington, in the United States. The abstract, welded Cor-Ten steel piece measures approximately  x  x . It was surveyed and deemed "treatment needed" by the Smithsonian Institution's "Save Outdoor Sculpture!" program in November 1994. The work is part of the Seattle One Percent for Art Collection and administered by the Seattle Arts Commission.

See also
 1975 in art

References

1975 establishments in Washington (state)
1975 sculptures
Abstract sculptures in Washington (state)
Capitol Hill, Seattle
Outdoor sculptures in Seattle
Sculptures by Lee Kelly
Steel sculptures in Washington (state)
Weathering steel